The Big Break VI: Trump National was the sixth edition of The Golf Channel's reality television series, The Big Break. The show awards exemptions into selected events on major professional golf tours.

This is the first time the show was held at a course in California: Donald Trump's Trump National Golf Club in Los Angeles. Trump made a cameo appearance in the season premiere, in addition to appearing periodically throughout the show. This is also the first mixed-gender edition of the show. Nine men and nine women competed for exemptions onto the Champions Tour and LPGA Tour, respectively. The two Champions Tour events the men competed to qualify for were the Turtle Bay Championship and the Bank of America Championship, while the two LPGA events the women competed for entry into were the SBS Open at Turtle Bay and the Longs Drugs Challenge. 

The show was taped in June and July 2006, and premiered on September 26, 2006  with the matchplay final broadcast on December 19, 2006.

Contestants

Women

Men

Ages are as of the time The Big Break VI was filmed in July 2006.

Elimination Chart

1 In episode 2 through 4, the contestants competed in pairs of men and women during the immunity and elimination challenges.
2 In episode 5, the remaining Men and Women faced off for immunity. The winning team would be exempt for the next episode whereas the other team would face elimination the following episode.
3 In episode 6, Trump announced that the previously 4 eliminated males from the show would participate in a Playback Challenge. The winner would earn the right to compete in the Elimination Challenge with the five males still on the show.
4 Bri won "The Big Break VI: Trump National" Women's championship matchplay final by defeating Bridget 3 & 1.
5 Denny won "The Big Break VI: Trump National" Men's championship matchplay final by defeating Jeff 1 up on the 19th hole.
6 Bri became the ultimate winner in "The Big Break VI: Trump National" by defeating Denny Hepler in a nine-hole skins match. After winning the last 4 out of the 9 holes, Bri was awarded $21,000 and a new car, while the women who partnered with her in holes 6 through 8 split $11,000.  Denny won $9000 while the men who partnered with him in holes 1 thru 5 split $9,000.
 Pink indicates the contestant is a female.
 Blue indicates the contestant is a male.
 Green background and WIN means the contestant won matchplay final and The Big Break.
 Blue background and WIN means the contestant won immunity from the elimination challenge.
 Purple background and WIN means the contestant won the playback challenge and was back on the show.
 Light blue background and HIGH means the contestant had a higher score in the elimination challenge.
 White background and IN means the contestant had a good enough score in the elimination challenge to move onto the next episode.
 Orange background and LOW means the contestant had one of the lower scores for the elimination challenge.
 Gray background and IN means the contestant had the episode off and was therefore safe.
 Red background and OUT means the contestant was eliminated from the competition

Winners' exemption performances
Denny Hepler competed in the 2007 Turtle Bay Championship, played on the Palmer Course at the Turtle Bay Resort, Kahuku, Hawai'i, January 22–28.  He finished tied for 72nd place, with a score of 222 (+6). 

Briana Vega competed on her first sponsor's exemption in the 2007 SBS Open at Turtle Bay.  She missed the cut and finished last, with a score of 161 (+17).  Fellow BBVI competitors and 2007 LPGA exempt rookies Kristy McPherson and Sarah Lynn Sargent also played in the tournament; McPherson missed the cut and finished with a +5 150, while Sargent made the cut and finished tied for 73rd place with a score of 225 (+9).

External links
Official Site
Preview video The Golf Channel
Golf Channel Announces 'Trumped Up' Big Break 6 The Golf Channel, May 9, 2006
Golf Channel press release announcing contestants

The Big Break
Television shows filmed in California